The 1991 Detroit Drive season was the fourth season for the Drive. They finished 9–1 and lost ArenaBowl V.

Regular season

Schedule

Standings

y – clinched regular-season title

x – clinched playoff spot

Playoffs

Roster

Awards

Detroit Drive Season, 1991
Detroit Drive
Massachusetts Marauders
1991 in Detroit